Hassan Chahine is a retired Moroccan hammer thrower.

He won the bronze medal at the 1983 Maghreb Championships finished fourth at the 1989 Jeux de la Francophonie, won the silver medal at the 1989 African Championships, the silver medal at the 1990 African Championships and the bronze medal at the 1990 Maghreb Championships.

His personal best throw was 67.30 metres, achieved in October 1989 in Cairo. This was the Moroccan record until 2013.

References

Year of birth missing (living people)
Living people
Moroccan male hammer throwers
Place of birth missing (living people)